
Year 592 (DXCII) was a leap year starting on Tuesday (link will display the full calendar) of the Julian calendar. The denomination 592 for this year has been used since the early medieval period, when the Anno Domini calendar era became the prevalent method in Europe for naming years.

Events 
 By place 
 Byzantine Empire 
 Emperor Maurice regains the Byzantine stronghold Singidunum (modern Belgrade) from the Avars. By counter-invading their homelands on the Balkans, Byzantine troops increase their pay by pillaging in hostile territory.

 Europe 
 January 28 – King Guntram, age 59, dies after a 31-year reign, and is succeeded by his nephew Childebert II, who becomes ruler of Burgundy. He is buried at Saint Marcellus of Chalons Church, in Chalon-sur-Saône (Eastern France).
 Ariulf, previously Lombard commander in the war against Persia, becomes the second Duke of Spoleto (Central Italy). 

 Britain 

 Battle of Woden's Burg: After the mass killing at Woden's Burg, near Marlborough (South West England), Ceawlin is deposed as king of the West Saxons. His son Cuthwine is taken prisoner and goes into exile.
 Ceol succeeds his uncle Ceawlin after his defeat at Woden's Burg. He becomes king of Wessex (according to the Anglo-Saxon Chronicle).

 Asia 
 Summer – Emperor Wéndi reduces taxes, due to an overflowing abundance of food and silk in the governmental stores. He sends messengers around central China, redistributing land to give the poor farming land.
 December 8 – Emperor Sushun of Japan is murdered after 5 years on the throne by agents of his rival Umako Soga, who is jealous of the emperor's power. He is succeeded by Suiko, widow of the late emperor Bidatsu. 
 Winter – Empress Suiko moves the imperial capital of Japan to Asuka-Toyura Palace (Nara Prefecture) during the Asuka period.

 By topic 
 Literature 
 Gregory, bishop of Tours, completes his Historia Francorum ("History of the Franks").

Births 
 Khalid ibn al-Walid, Arab general (approximate date)
 Asmā' bint Abi Bakr, companion of Muhammad
 Cutha Cathwulf, prince of Wessex (approximate date)
 Itta, wife of Pepin of Landen (d. 652)
 Xu Jingzong, chancellor of the Tang Dynasty (d. 672)

Deaths 
 January 28 – Guntram, king of Burgundy
 Faroald I, duke of Spoleto (Italy)
 Sushun, emperor of Japan

References